Abdulla bin Abdulaziz bin Turki Al Subaie is the Qatari Minister of Municipality. He was appointed as minister on 19 October 2021.

Education 
Al Subaie holds a Bachelor of Electrical Engineering (1996), a Master of Business Administration (2006) and a PhD of Administration from the Qatar University.

Career 
Between 1996 and 2008, Al Subaie worked for the Qatar General Electricity and Water Corporation. He was the Chief Executive Officer of Smeet, a subsidiary of Qatari Diar, from 2008 until 2011.

From April 2011 to May 2014, he worked as the group Chief Executive Officer for Barwa, a real estate development and investment holding group.

In March 2011, Al Subaie was appointed the Managing Director of Qatar Rail. Since January 2017, he is the Chief Executive Officer of Qatar Rail.

References 

Living people
21st-century Qatari politicians
Qatari politicians
Government ministers of Qatar
Year of birth missing (living people)

Qatar University alumni